Kenneth Kove (1892–1984) was a British actor. He was a regular member of the Aldwych farce team between 1923 and 1930, often in "silly-ass" roles; appearing in It Pays to Advertise (1923), Thark (1927), A Cup of Kindness (1929), and A Night Like This (1930).  He also appeared in several films.

Filmography

 Murder! (1930)
 The Great Game (1930)
 Almost a Divorce (1931)
 Down River (1931)
 The Chance of a Night Time (1931)
 The Man at Six (1931)
 Fascination (1931)
 Mischief (1931)
 Out of the Blue (1931)
 Two White Arms (1932)
 Help Yourself (1932)
 Diamond Cut Diamond (1932)
 Her First Affaire (1932)
 Pyjamas Preferred (1932)
 Song of the Plough (1933)
 The Man from Toronto (1933)
 Crime on the Hill (1933)
 Dora (1933)
 Send 'em Back Half Dead (1933)
 The Life of the Party (1934)
 The Crimson Candle (1934)
 Youthful Folly (1934)
 The Scarlet Pimpernel (1934)
 Crazy People (1934)
 Leave It to Blanche (1934)
 Look Up and Laugh (1935)
 Radio Pirates (1935)
 Marry the Girl (1935)
 Mother, Don't Rush Me (1936)
 The Bank Messenger Mystery (1936)
 Cheer Up (1936)
 Talking Feet (1937)
 Black Eyes (1939)
 Asking for Trouble (1942)
 They Knew Mr. Knight (1946)
 Golden Arrow (1949)
 Stage Fright (1950)
 Treasure Hunt (1952)
 Innocents in Paris (1953)
 Out of the Clouds (1955)
 You Lucky People (1955)
 Raising the Wind (1961)
 The Organizer (1963)
 A Jolly Bad Fellow (1964)
 The Evil of Frankenstein (1964)
 Dr. Terror's House of Horrors (1965)

References

External links
 

1892 births
1984 deaths
English male stage actors
English male film actors
English male television actors
People from Wandsworth
Male actors from London
20th-century English male actors